Joaquim Serra (born Joaquim Maria Serra Sobrinho) was a Brazilian journalist, professor, politician and playwright. He was born in São Luís, Maranhão on July 20, 1838, and died in Rio de Janeiro on October 29, 1888. He was the patron of Chair 21 at the Brazilian Academy of Letters, by choice of José do Patrocínio.

His father, Leonel Joaquim Serra, was active in politics and journalism, writing O Cometa (1835) and Crônica dos Cronistas (1838), in São Luís. Joaquim studied humanities in his native province. Between 1854 and 1858, he was in Rio de Janeiro for admission to the old Military School, a career he abandoned, returning to São Luís. Without further seeking a college degree, he embarked on a career in journalism and poetry.

His first writings (1858–60) were published in Publicador Maranhense, directed by Sotero dos Reis. In 1862, with some friends, he founded the newspaper Coalizão, which supported the Liberal Party in politics. In 1867, he founded Semanário Maranhense. He was professor of Grammar and Literature at the Liceu Maranhense, provincial deputy (1864–67), and secretary of the Government of Paraíba (1864–67). In 1868, he took up residence in Rio de Janeiro. He was part of the newsrooms of Reforma, Gazeta de Notícias, Folha Nova and O País, and he served as director of the Official Gazette (1878–82).

He was deputy general (1878–81) for Maranhão, and a tenacious combatant in the abolitionist campaign against slavery. He was among the most vocal of Brazilian abolitionists, according to André Rebouças. He also wrote for the theater, as an author and translator. His pieces, however, apparently never were printed. He adopted several pseudonyms: Amigo Ausente, Ignotus, Max Sedlitz, Pietro de Castellamare, Tragaldabas.

A few days after his burial, Machado de Assis praised him: “When the day of the abolitionist victory came, all of his brave battle companions gloriously mentioned the name of Joaquim Serra among the disciples of the first hour, among the most strenuous, strong and devoted.”

References

Brazilian writers